was a Japanese daimyō of the Edo period, who ruled the Tokushima Domain. His court title was Awa no kami.

His daughter married the court noble Takatsukasa Masahiro.

Family
 Father: Satake Yoshimichi (1701-1765)
 Mother: daughter of Naito Masamori
 Wife: Tsutehime
 Concubines:
 Yanada-ji
 Lady Kiso
 Ochie no Kata
 Osaki no Kata
 commoner
 Children:
 Hachisuka Haruaki by Tsutehime
 Hachisuka Yoshikuni by Tsutehime
 Hachisuka Yoshinori by Tsutehime
 Hachisuka Yoshinobu by Tsutehime
 Hachisuka Nobutoshi by Yanada-ji
 Nariko (1771-1795) married Takatsukasa Masahiro by Yanada-ji
 Yukiko (1771-1838) married Daigo Teruhisa by Yanada-ji
 Hachisuka Nobumura by Lady Kiso
 daughter married Nakanoin Michitomo by Lady Kiso
 Sadahime married Matsudaira Tadashige by Ochie no Kata
 Hachisuka Nobuyori by Ochie no Kata
 Sumihime married Matsudaira Mitsutsura by Ochie no Kata
 Iyohime (1791-1854) married Tozawa Masatsugu by Ochie no Kata
 Hachisuka Nobuzumi by Osaki no Kata
 Hachisuka Akiyoshi by Commoner
 Hachisuka Akinori by Commoner
 Hachisuka Akihide by Commoner
 Morihime married Hori Chikashige by Commoner
 Ryuhime married Kuki Takakuni by Commoner

Ancestry

References

1738 births
1801 deaths
Daimyo
Hachisuka clan